Augusta is an unincorporated community in Houston County, Texas, United States, about 16 miles from Crockett. The town was settled before 1860, the year the school was built. Today a cemetery and a community center remain in the area. Its estimated population was about 20 in 2000. Local students (if any) go to school in the Grapeland ISD.

References

Unincorporated communities in Houston County, Texas
Unincorporated communities in Texas